Brad Oscar (born September 22, 1964) is an American musical theatre actor, known for his Broadway performances in musicals such as The Producers and Jekyll and Hyde. He has earned two Tony Award nominations: one for The Producers as Franz Liebkind, and one for Something Rotten! as Nostradamus.

Career
Oscar graduated with a BFA from the Boston University College of Fine Arts in 1986 and was awarded a Distinguished Alumni Award in 2006.

Oscar's Broadway debut was in the 1990 musical Aspects of Love as a swing. His next roles were in Jekyll and Hyde, as Sir Peter, Archibald Proops, Barrow Boy, and Second Gentleman in both the 1995 tour and the 1997 Broadway show.

His performance, however, in The Producers garnered him the most acclaim. Oscar started out as Franz Liebkind, and was also understudy for Max Bialystock (one of the lead roles) and Roger De Bris. The role of Franz earned Oscar a Tony nomination for Best Featured Actor in a Musical, but lost to his co-star Gary Beach. After this success, he replaced Nathan Lane as Bialystock. In 2007, he originated the Bialystock role in the Las Vegas production at the Paris Hotel and Casino.

He has appeared in several productions at the Arena Stage in Washington, D.C. In 2005 he played "The Devil" (Mr. Applegate) in  Damn Yankees, and in October 2006 he played "The Master of Ceremonies" in Cabaret. He played multiple roles,  including "Lady Enid", in The Mystery of Irma Vep from June 2008 through July 13, 2008.

Oscar's other regional work includes the title role in the musical Barnum, at the Asolo Repertory Theatre (Florida), from November 12 through December 20, 2008. In recent years, Brad and his sister, Victoria Oscar, have served as the official Santa and Mrs. Claus for the annual National Christmas Tree Lighting Program.

Oscar took over the role of "Uncle Fester" (from Kevin Chamberlin) in The Addams Family on Broadway starting March 8, 2011.

He originated the role of Nostradamus in the musical Something Rotten!, which opened on Broadway in April 2015, for which he earned a 2015 Tony Award nomination for Best Performance by an Actor in a Featured Role in a Musical, which went to his co-star Christian Borle. He stayed with the production until its closing in January 2017.

He played the role of Beadle Bamford in the Tooting Arts Club production of Sweeney Todd at the Off-Broadway Barrow Street Theatre.

Personal life
Oscar and Diego Prieto, an actor, were married on April 16, 2012, in a ceremony at the Arena Stage, where they met during the 2005 production of Damn Yankees, with Molly Smith officiating.

Credits

Theatre

Film

Television

Awards and nominations

References

External links

An Interview on Talkin' Broadway, 2002

1964 births
American male musical theatre actors
Living people
Male actors from Washington, D.C.
20th-century American male actors
21st-century American male actors
American gay actors
21st-century LGBT people